The Lucky Nine were an English rock band that features members of some other top British rock bands, for instance A, Hundred Reasons and (the now defunct) Cable and Sunna/earthtone9. Their collaboration has resulted in the record True Crown Foundation Songs: Hymns of History and Hidden Ritual, although in a 2005 interview with rockmidgets.com Dan Carter stated that 'two thirds' of the second album were already written and would be released at some point.

Current lineup 
Colin Doran – Vocals
Jay David Rowe – Bass
Richie Mills – Drums
Ben Doyle – Guitar
Daniel P. Carter – Guitar

Discography

Albums
 True Crown Foundation Songs: Hymns of History and Hidden Ritual

Other records
 The Lucky Nine (EP)

English rock music groups